The large lizard genus Anolis contains around 436 accepted anole species, which have been considered in a number of subgroups, or clades such as carolinensis and isolepis.

Nota bene: In the following list, a taxon authority in parentheses indicates that the species was originally described in a different genus.

A

 
Anolis acutus Hallowell, 1856 – St. Croix anole, sharp anole
Anolis aeneus Gray, 1840 – Grenada bush anole, bronze anole
Anolis aequatorialis F. Werner, 1898 – equatorial anole
Anolis agassizi Stejneger, 1900 – Agassiz's anole
Anolis agueroi (Díaz, Navarro & Garrido, 1998) – Cabo Cruz bearded anole, Aguero's anole
Anolis ahli Barbour, 1925 – Escambray blue-eyed anole, Ahl's anole
Anolis alayoni Estrada & Hedges, 1995 – Guantanamo twig anole, Alayon's anole
Anolis alfaroi Garrido & Hedges, 1992 – Small-fanned bush anole, Alfaro's anole
Anolis aliniger Mertens, 1939 – axillary spotted anole, northern green twig anole, La Vega anole
Anolis allisoni Barbour, 1928 – Cuban blue anole, Allison's anole
Anolis allogus Barbour & Ramsden, 1919 – Spanish Flag anole, Bueycito anole
Anolis alocomyos Köhler, Vargas, & Lotzkat, 2014
Anolis altae Dunn, 1930 – high anole
Anolis altavelensis Noble & Hassler, 1933 – Alto Velo gracile anole, Noble's anole
Anolis altitudinalis Garrido, 1985 – Turquino green-mottled anole 
Anolis alumina Hertz, 1976 – Barahona grass anole, shiny anole
Anolis alutaceus Cope, 1861 – blue-eyed grass-bush anole, Monte Verde anole, blue-eyed twig anole
Anolis alvarezdeltoroi Nieto Montes de Oca, 1996 – Alvarez del Toro's Anole 
Anolis amplisquamosus (McCranie, Wilson & K. Williams, 1993)
Anolis anatoloros Ugueto, Rivas, Barros, Sánchez-Pacheco & García-Pérez, 2007
Anolis anchicayae Poe, Velasco, Miyata & E. Williams, 2009
Anolis anfiloquioi Garrido, 1980 – brown-eyed bush anole, Anfiodlul anole
Anolis angusticeps Hallowell, 1856 – Cuban twig anole
Anolis anisolepis H.M. Smith, Burley & Fritts, 1968 – Chiapas ornate anole
Anolis annectens E. Williams, 1974 – annex anole
Anolis anoriensis Velasco, Gutiérrez-Cárdenas & Quintero-Angel, 2010
Anolis antioquiae E. Williams, 1985 – Antiodlula anole
Anolis antonii Boulenger, 1908 – San Antonio anole, Anton's anole
Anolis apletolepis Kohler & Hedges, 2016 – La Selle twig anole 
Anolis apletophallus G. Köhler & Sunyer, 2008
Anolis apollinaris Boulenger, 1919 – Boulenger's anole
Anolis aquaticus Taylor, 1956 – water anole
Anolis arenal Köhler & Vargas, 2019 
Anolis argenteolus Cope, 1861 – Cuban trunk anole, Guantanamo anole
Anolis argillaceus Cope, 1862 – Cuban dark bark anole, bay anole
Anolis aridius Köhler, Zimmer, McGrath, & Hedges, 2019 
Anolis armouri (Cochran, 1934) – armoured anole, Armour's anole, black-throated stout anole
Anolis auratus Daudin, 1802 – grass anole
Anolis aurifer Schwartz, 1968
Anolis australis Köhler, Zimmer, McGrath, & Hedges, 2019 – southern stout anole

B

Anolis bahorucoensis Noble & Hassler, 1933 – Baoruco long-snouted anole, Bahoruco long-snouted anole
Anolis bahorucoensis bahorucoensis Noble & Hassler, 1933
Anolis bahorucoensis southerlandi Schwartz, 1978
Anolis baleatus (Cope, 1864) – Dominican giant anole, Puerto Plata anole
Anolis baleatus altager Schwartz, 1975
Anolis baleatus baleatus (Cope, 1864)
Anolis baleatus caeruleolatus Schwartz, 1974
Anolis baleatus fraudator Schwartz, 1974
Anolis baleatus lineatacervix Schwartz, 1978
Anolis baleatus litorisilva Schwartz, 1974
Anolis baleatus multistruppus Schwartz, 1974
Anolis baleatus samanae Schwartz, 1974
Anolis baleatus scelestus Schwartz, 1974
Anolis baleatus sublimis Schwartz, 1974
Anolis baracoae Schwartz, 1964 – Baracoa anole
Anolis barahonae E. Williams, 1962 – Baracoa giant anole, Barahona anole
Anolis barahonae albocellatus Schwartz, 1974
Anolis barahonae barahonae E. Williams, 1962
Anolis barahonae ininquinatus Cullom & Schwartz, 1980
Anolis barahonae mulitus Cullom & Schwartz, 1980
Anolis barbatus (Garrido, 1982) – western bearded anole
Anolis barbouri (Schmidt, 1919) – Hispaniolan hopping anole
Anolis barkeri (Schmidt, 1939) – Barker's anole
Anolis bartschi (Cochran, 1934) – Pinar Del Rio cliff anole, western cliff anole, West Cuban anole
Anolis beckeri  – Becker's lichen anole
Anolis bellipeniculus (Myers & Donnelly, 1996)
Anolis benedikti Lotzkat, Bienentreu, Hertz & G. Köhler, 2011
Anolis bicaorum (G. Köhler, 1996) – Bay Islands anole
Anolis bimaculatus (Sparrman, 1784) – Statia Bank tree anole, panther anole
Anolis binotatus W. Peters, 1863 – two-marked anole
Anolis biporcatus (Wiegmann, 1834) – giant green anole, neotropical green anole
Anolis birama Garrido, 1980 – Cuban big-eared anole, branch anole
Anolis bitectus Cope, 1864 – roof anole
Anolis blanquillanus Hummelinck, 1940 – La Blanquilla anole, Hummelinck's anole
Anolis boettgeri Boulenger, 1911 – Boettger's anole
Anolis bombiceps Cope, 1876 – surprise anole, blue-lipped forest anole
Anolis bonairensis Ruthven, 1923 – Bonaire anole, Ruthven's anole
Anolis boulengerianus Thominot, 1887 – Tehuantepec anole
Anolis brasiliensis Vanzolini & Williams, 1970 – Brazilian anole
Anolis bremeri Barbour, 1914 – Cuban variegated anole, Herradura anole
Anolis bremeri bremeri Barbour, 1914
Anolis bremeri insulaepinorum Garrido, 1972
Anolis breslini Schwartz, 1980 - Northwest Haitian stout anole
Anolis brevirostris Bocourt, 1870 – desert gracile anole, shortnose anole
Anolis brevirostris brevirostris Bocourt, 1870
Anolis brevirostris deserticola D. Arnold, 1980
Anolis brevirostris wetmorei Cochran, 1931
Anolis brianjuliani Köhler, Petersen, & Méndez de la Cruz, 2019
Anolis brooksi Barbour, 1923
Anolis brunneus Cope, 1894 – Crooked-Acklins green anole, Crooked Island anole

C

Anolis caceresae Hofmann & Townsend, 2018 – Berta's anole
Anolis calimae Ayala, Harris & E. Williams, 1993 – Ayala's anole
Anolis callainus Köhler &  Hedges, 2020 – Dominican green anole, Northern Hispaniolan green anole, Hispaniolan green anole
Anolis campbelli (G. Köhler & E.N. Smith), 2008
Anolis capito W. Peters, 1863 – bighead anole
Anolis caquetae E. Williams, 1974 – Caqueta anole
Anolis carlliebi G. Köhler et al., 2014 – Carl Lieb's anole
Anolis carlostoddi (E. Williams, Praderio & Gorzula, 1996) – Carlos Todd's anole
Anolis carolinensis Voigt, 1832 – green anole, North American green anole, Carolina anole 
Anolis carpenteri A.A. Echelle, A.F. Echelle & Fitch, 1971 – Carpenter's anole
Anolis casildae Arosemena, Ibáñez & De Sousa, 1991 – Casilda's anole
Anolis caudalis Cochran, 1932 – Gonave gracile anole, Cochran's gianthead anole
Anolis centralis J. Peters, 1970 – central pallid anole, central anole
Anolis centralis centralis J. Peters, 1970
Anolis centralis litoralis Garrido, 1975
Anolis chamaeleonides A.M.C. Duméril & Bibron, 1837 – short-bearded anole
Anolis charlesmyersi Köhler, 2010 
Anolis chloris Boulenger, 1898 – Boulenger's green anole
Anolis chlorocyanus A.M.C. Duméril & Bibron, 1837 – Tiburon green anole, Hispaniolan green anole, Jeremie anole
Anolis chlorodius Kohler & Hedges, 2016 – Pedernales green anole
Anolis christophei E. Williams, 1960 – big-fanned trunk anole, King Christophe anole
Anolis chrysolepis A.M.C. Duméril & Bibron, 1837 – goldenscale anole
Anolis chrysops Lazell, 1964
Anolis clivicola Barbour & Shreve, 1935 – Turquino fern anole, mountain anole
Anolis cobanensis L. Stuart, 1942 – Stuart's anole
Anolis compressicauda Smith & Kerster, 1955 – Malposo scaly anole
Anolis concolor Cope, 1863 – Isla San Andres anole
Anolis confusus Estrada & Garrido, 1991 – Cabo Cruz trunk anole
Anolis conspersus Garman, 1887 – Cayman Islands blue-fanned anole, Grand Cayman blue-fanned anole, Grand Cayman anole
Anolis conspersus conspersus Garman, 1887
Anolis conspersus lewisi Grant, 1940
Anolis cooki Grant, 1931 – Guanica pallid anole, Cook's pallid anole, Cook's anole
Anolis crassulus Cope, 1864 – ornate anole
Anolis cristatellus A.M.C. Duméril & Bibron, 1837 – crested anole
Anolis cristatellus cristatellus A.M.C. Duméril & Bibron, 1837 – Puerto Rican crested anole
Anolis cristatellus wileyae Grant, 1931 
Anolis cristifer H.M. Smith, 1968 – crested lichen anole, Cristifer anole
Anolis cryptolimifrons G. Köhler & Sunyer, 2008
Anolis cupeyalensis J. Peters, 1970 – stripe-bellied grass anole, Cupeyal anole
Anolis cupreus Hallowell, 1860 – copper anole
Anolis cupreus cupreus Hallowell, 1860
Anolis cupreus dariense Fitch & Seigel, 1984
Anolis cupreus hoffmani W. Peters, 1863
Anolis cupreus spilomelas Fitch, A.A. Echelle & A.F. Echelle, 1972
Anolis cuprinus H.M. Smith, 1964 – copper anole, Chiapas anole
Anolis cuscoensis (Poe, Yañez-Miranda & Lehr, 2008)
Anolis cusuco (McCranie, G. Köhler & Wilson, 2000)
Anolis cuvieri (Merrem, 1820) – Cuvier's anole, green giant anole or Puerto Rican giant anole
Anolis cyanopleurus Cope, 1861 – green fern anole, Yateras anole
Anolis cyanopleurus cyanopleurus Cope, 1861
Anolis cyanopleurus orientalis Garrido, 1975
Anolis cyanostictus Mertens, 1939 – Santo Domingo green anole
Anolis cybotes (Cope, 1862) – Hispaniolan stout anole, large-headed anole
Anolis cybotes cybotes Cope, 1862
Anolis cybotes doris Barbour, 1925
Anolis cybotes ravifaux Schwartz & Henderson, 1982
Anolis cymbops (Cope, 1864) – Cope's Veracruz anole

D
Anolis damulus Cope, 1864 – Cope's smooth anole
Anolis danieli E. Williams, 1988 – Daniel's anole
Anolis darlingtoni (Cochran, 1935) – La Hotte twig anole, Darlington's anole
Anolis datzorum (Köhler, Ponce, Sunyer, & Batista, 2007)
Anolis delafuentei Garrido, 1982 –Escambray crested anole, Guamuhaya anole
Anolis deltae E. Williams, 1974 – delta anole
Anolis demissus Schwartz, 1969 – Île Grande Cayemite green anole
Anolis desechensis (Heatwole, 1976) – Desecheo anole, Heatwole's anole
Anolis desiradei Lazell, 1964 – La Desirade anole
Anolis dissimilis E. Williams, 1965 – odd anole
Anolis distichus (Cope, 1861) – bark anole
Anolis distichus biminiensis Oliver, 1948
Anolis distichus dapsilis Schwartz, 1968
Anolis distichus distichoides Rosén, 1911
Anolis distichus distichus Cope, 1861 – common bark anole
Anolis distichus floridanus H.M. Smith and McCauley, 1948 – Florida bark anole
Anolis distichus juliae Cochran, 1934
Anolis distichus ocior Schwartz, 1968
Anolis distichus patruelis Schwartz, 1968
Anolis distichus sejunctus Shwartz, 1968
Anolis distichus suppar Schwartz, 1968
Anolis distichus tostus Schwartz, 1968
Anolis divius Kohler & Hedges, 2016 – Baoruco blue anole
Anolis dolichocephalus E. Williams, 1963 – La Hotte long-snouted anole, Place Negre anole
Anolis dolichocephalus dolichocephalus E. Williams, 1963,
Anolis dolichocephalus portusalus Schwartz, 1978
Anolis dolichocephalus sarmenticola Schwartz, 1978
Anolis dollfusianus (Bocourt, 1873) – coffee anole
Anolis dominicensis Reinhardt and Lütken, 1863 – Dominican Republic bark anole
Anolis doris Barbour, 1925 – Gonave stout anole
Anolis dracula (Yánez-Muñoz et al., 2018) – Dracula anole
Anolis duellmani Fitch & Henderson, 1973 – Duellman's pigmy anole
Anolis dunni Smith, 1936 – Dunn's anole

E
Anolis eladioi Kohler & Hedges, 2016 – Baoruco green anole
Anolis elcopeensis Poe, Scarpetta, & Schaad, 2015

Anolis equestris  (Merrem, 1820) – Cuban giant anole, knight anole
Anolis equestris brujensis Garrido, 2001
Anolis equestris buidei Schwartz and Garrido, 1972
Anolis equestris cincoleguas Garrido, 1981
Anolis equestris cyaneus Garrido and Estrada, 2001
Anolis equestris equestris Merrem, 1820
Anolis equestris juraguensis Schwartz and Garrido, 1972
Anolis equestris persparsus Schwartz and Garrido, 1972,
Anolis equestris potior Schwartz and Thomas, 1975
Anolis equestris sabinalensis Garrido and Moreno, 2001
Anolis equestris thomasi Schwartz, 1959
Anolis equestris verreonensis Schwartz and Garrido, 1972
Anolis ernestwilliamsi (Lazell, 1983) – Carrot Rock anole, Carrot Rock's anole, Ernest's anole
Anolis etheridgei E. Williams, 1962 – montane bush anole, Etheridge's anole
Anolis eugenegrahami (Schwartz, 1978) – Eugene's anole, black stream anole 
Anolis eulaemus (Boulenger, 1908) – good anole
Anulis euskalerriari (Barros, E. Williams, and Viloria, 1996)
Anolis evermanni (Stejneger, 1904) – emerald anole, Evermann's anole, or small green anole
Anolis extremus (Garman, 1887) – Barbados anole

F
Anolis fairchildi Barbour & Shreve, 1935 – Cay Sal anole, Fairchild's anole
Anolis fasciatus (Boulenger, 1885) – banded anole
Anolis favillarum Schwartz, 1968
Anolis ferreus (Cope, 1864) – Morne Constant anole
Anolis festae (Peracca, 1904) – Veronica's anole
Anolis fitchi (Williams & Duellman, 1984) – Fitch's anole
Anolis forresti Barbour, 1923
Anolis fortunensis (Arosemena & Ibanez, 1993)
Anolis fowleri (Schwartz, 1973) – green-banded anole, Fowler's anole
Anolis fraseri (Günther, 1859) – Fraser's anole
Anolis frenatus (Cope, 1899) – bridled anole
Anolis fugitivus Garrido, 1975 – green-headed grass anole, Moa anole
Anolis fungosus Myers, 1971 – Myers's anole
Anolis fuscoauratus (D'Orbigny, 1837) – brown-eared anole, slender anole

G
Anolis gadovii (Boulenger, 1905) – Gadow's anole
Anolis gaigei Ruthven, 1916 – Gaige's anole
Anolis garmani (Stejneger, 1899) – Jamaican giant anole, Jamaican anole, Jamaica giant anole 
Anolis garridoi Diaz, Estrada & Moreno, 1996 – Escambray twig anole, Garrido's anole
Anolis gemmosus (O'Shaughnessy, 1875)) – Andes anole, O'Shaughnessy's anole
Anolis gibbiceps (Cope, 1864) – hook anole
Anolis ginaelisae (Lotzkat, Bienentreu, Hertz & G. Köhler, 2013)
Anolis gingivinus (Cope, 1864) – Anguilla bank tree anole, Anguilla bank anole, Anguilla anole
Anolis gonavensis Kohler & Hedges, 2016 – Gonave twig anole
Anolis gorgonae (Barbour, 1905) – blue anole
Anolis gracilipes (Boulenger, 1898) – charm anole
Anolis grahami (Gray, 1845) – Jamaican turquoise anole, Graham's anole
Anolis grahami aquarum Underwood & Williams, 1959
Anolis grahami grahami Gray, 1845
Anolis granuliceps (Boulenger, 1898) – granular anole
Anolis griseus (Garman, 1887) – St. Vincent's tree anole
Anolis gruuo (Köhler, Ponce, Sunyer & Batista, 2007)
Anolis guafe (Estrada & Garrido, 1991) – Cabo Cruz banded anole
Anolis guamuhaya (Garrido, Pérez-Beato, & Moreno, 1991) – Escambray bearded anole
Anolis guazuma Garrido, 1984 – Turquino twig anole, Sierra anole
Anolis gundlachi (Peters, 1877) – yellow-chinned anole, Gundlach's anole, yellow-bearded anole

H
Anolis haguei (L. Stuart, 1942) – Hague's Anole
Anolis hendersoni (Cochran, 1923) – La Selle long-snouted anole, Henderson's anole
Anolis hendersoni hendersoni Cochran, 1923
Anolis hendersoni ravidormitans Schwartz, 1978
Anolis heterodermus (A.H.A. Duméril, 1851) – flat Andes anole
Anolis heteropholidotus Mertens, 1952
Anolis higuey Köhler, Zimmer, McGrath, & Hedges, 2019 – Cordillera Oriental stout anole
Anolis hispaniolae Köhler, Zimmer, McGrath, & Hedges, 2019
Anolis hobartsmithi (Nieto-Montes de Oca, 2001) – Hobart Smith's anole
Anolis homolechis (Cope, 1864) – Habana anole, Cuban white-fanned anole
Anolis homolechis homolechis Cope, 1864
Anolis homolechis turquinensis Garrido, 1973
Anolis huilae (Williams, 1982) – Huila anole
Anolis humilis (Peters, 1863) – humble anole
Anolis hyacinthogularis Torres-Carvajal, Ayala-Varela, Lobos, Poe, & Narvaez, 2017 – blue dewlap anole

I
Anolis ibague (Williams, 1975) – Ibague anole
Anolis ibanezi (Poe, Latella, Ryan, & Schaad, 2009)
Anolis ignigularis Mertens, 1939 – brown bark anole
Anolis imias (Ruibal & Williams, 1961) – Imias rock anole, Imias anole
Anolis immaculogularis Köhler et al., 2014
Anolis impetigosus Cope, 1864
Anolis incredulus Garrido & Moreno, 1998 – Turquino emerald anole
Anolis inderenae (Rueda & Hernández-Camacho, 1988)
Anolis inexpectatus Garrido & Estrada, 1989 – pineland bush anole
Anolis insignis (Cope, 1871) – decorated anole
Anolis insolitus (Williams & Rand, 1969) – Cordillera central twig anole, La Palma anole
Anolis isolepis (Cope, 1861) – dwarf green anole, Jatibonico anole

J
Anolis jacare (Boulenger, 1903) – Jacare anole
Anolis johnmeyeri (Wilson & McCranie, 1982) – Meyer's anole
Anolis juangundlachi Garrido, 1975 – yellow-lipped grass anole, Finca Ceres anole
Anolis jubar (Schwartz, 1968) – Cuban coast anole, Cubitas anole
Anolis jubar albertschwartzi Garrido, 1973
Anolis jubar balaenarum Schwartz, 1968
Anolis jubar cocoensis Estrada & Garrido, 1990
Anolis jubar cuneus Schwartz, 1968
Anolis jubar gibarensis Garrido, 1973
Anolis jubar jubar Schwartz, 1968
Anolis jubar maisiensis Garrido, 1973
Anolis jubar oriens Schwartz, 1968
Anolis jubar santamariae Garrido, 1973
Anolis jubar yagujayensis Garrido, 1973

K
Anolis kahouannensis (Lazell, 1964) – Kahouanne anole
Anolis kathydayae Poe & Ryan, 2017
Anolis kemptoni (Dunn, 1940) – Kempton's anole
Anolis koopmani (Rand, 1961) – Haitian brown red-bellied anole, Koopman's anole
Anolis kreutzi (McCranie, Köhler, & Wilson, 2000)
Anolis krugi (Peters, 1877) – olive bush anole, Krug's anole, orange dewlap anole
Anolis kunalayae (Hulebak, Poe, Ibánez, & Williams, 2007)

L
Anolis laevis (Cope, 1876) – smooth anole
Anolis laeviventris (Wiegmann, 1834) – white anole
Anolis lamari (Williams, 1992)
Anolis landestoyi Mahler et al. (2016) – Hispaniolan chamaeleon anole
Anolis latifrons (Berthold, 1846)
Anolis leachii (Duméril & Bibron, 1837) – Antigua Bank tree anole, Barbuda Bank tree anole, panther anole
Anolis leditzigorum Köhler, Vargas, & Lotzkat, 2014
Anolis lemniscatus (Boulenger, 1898)
Anolis lemurinus (Cope, 1861) – ghost anole
Anolis leucodera Kohler & Hedges, 2016 – Bombardopolis green anole
Anolis limifrons (Cope, 1871) – slender anole, border anole
Anolis limon Velasco & Hurtado-Gomez, 2014
Anolis lineatopus Gray, 1840 – Jamaican gray anole, stripefoot anole
Anolis lineatopus ahenobarbus] Underwood & Williams, 1959
Anolis lineatopus lineatopus Gray, 1840
Anolis lineatopus merope Underwood & Williams, 1959
Anolis lineatopus neckeri Grant, 1940
Anolis lineatus (Daudin, 1802) – striped anole
Anolis liogaster (Boulenger, 1905) – Guerreran anole
Anolis lionotus (Cope, 1861) – lion anole
Anolis litoralis Garrido, 1975 – Oriente pallid anole
Anolis lividus (Garman, 1888) – Plymouth anole, Montserrat anole
Anolis longiceps Schmidt, 1919 – Navassa anole
Anolis longitibialis (Noble, 1923) – Barahona stout anole, Isla Beata anole
Anolis longitibialis longitibialis Noble, 1923
Anolis longitibialis specuum Schwartz, 1979
Anolis lososi Torres-Carvajal, Ayala-Varela, Lobos, Poe, & Narvaez, 2017 – Losos's anole
Anolis loveridgei (Schmidt, 1936) – Loveridge's anole
Anolis loysiana Duméril & Bibron, 1837 – spiny anole, peach anole
Anolis luciae (Garman, 1888) – St. Lucia anole, Saint Lucian anole
Anolis lucius Duméril & Bibron, 1837 – cave anole, slender cliff anole

Anolis luteogularis (Noble & Hassler, 1935) – western giant anole, white-throated anole
Anolis luteogularis calceus Schwartz & Garrido, 1972
Anolis luteogularis coctilis Schwartz & Garrido, 1972
Anolis luteogularis delacruzi Schwartz & Garrido, 1972
Anolis luteogularis hassleri Barbour & Shreve, 1935
Anolis luteogularis jaumei Schwartz & Garrido, 1972
Anolis luteogularis luteogularis Noble & Hassler, 1935
Anolis luteogularis nivevultus Schwartz & Garrido, 1972
Anolis luteogularis sanfelipensis Garrido, 1975
Anolis luteogularis sectilis Schwartz & Garrido, 1972
Anolis luteosignifer (Garman, 1888) – Cayman Brac anole
Anolis lynchi (Miyata, 1985) – Lynch's anole
Anolis lyra (Poe, Velasco, Miyata, & Williams, 2009)

M
Anolis macilentus Garrido & Hedges, 1992 – black-cheeked bush anole
Anolis macrinii (H.M. Smith, 1968) – Macrinius's anole
Anolis macrolepis (Boulenger, 1911) – big-scaled anole
Anolis macrophallus (F. Werner, 1917)
Anolis maculigula (E. Williams, 1984) – Rueda's anole
Anolis maculiventris (Boulenger, 1898) – blotchbelly anole
Anolis magnaphallus (Poe & Ibánez, 2007)
Anolis maia Batista, Vesely, Mebert, Lotzkat & G. Köhler, 2015
Anolis marcanoi (E. Williams, 1975) – red-fanned stout anole, Marcano's anole
Anolis mariarum (Barbour, 1932) – blemished anole

Anolis marmoratus (A.M.C. Duméril & Bibron, 1837) – Guadeloupe anole, Guadeloupean anole, leopard anole
Anolis marron (Arnold, 1980) – Jacmel gracile anole, Jacmel anole
Anolis marsupialis Taylor, 1956
Anolis matudai (H.M. Smith, 1956) – Matuda's anole
Anolis maynardii Garman, 1888 – Maynard's anole
Anolis mccraniei (G. Köhler, Townsend & Petersen, 2016)
Anolis medemi (Ayala & E. Williams, 1988)
Anolis megalopithecus (Rueda-Almonacid, 1989) – Ruida's anole
Anolis megapholidotus Smith, 1933 – large-scaled anole
Anolis menta (Ayala, Harris & E. Williams, 1984) – mixed anole
Anolis meridionalis (Boettger, 1885)
Anolis mestrei Barbour & Ramsden, 1916 – red-fanned rock anole, Pinar del Rio anole
Anolis microlepidotus (Davis, 1954) – Guerreran oak anole
Anolis microtus (Cope, 1871) – tiny anole
Anolis milleri (H.M. Smith, 1950) – Miller's anole
Anolis mirus (E. Williams, 1963)
Anolis monensis (Stejneger, 1904) – Mona anole
Anolis monteverde (G. Köhler, 2009)
Anolis monticola (Shreve, 1936) – La Hotte bush anole, foothill anole
Anolis monticola monticola Shreve, 1936
Anolis monticola quadrisartus (Thomas & Schwartz, 1967)
Anolis morazani (Townsend & Wilson, 2009)
Anolis muralla (Köhler, McCranie & Wilson, 1999)

N
Anolis nasofrontalis (Amaral, 1933) – nose anole
Anolis naufragus (Campbell, Hillis, & Lamar, 1989) – Hidalgo anole
Anolis neblininus (Myers, Williams, & McDiarmid, 1993)
Anolis nebuloides (Bocourt, 1873) – false clouded anole
Anolis nebulosus (Wiegmann, 1834) – clouded anole
Anolis neglectus Prates, Melo-Sampaio, de Queiroz, Carnaval, Rodrigues, & Oliveira-Drummond, 2019. – Serra dos Órgãos anole
Anolis nelsoni (Barbour, 1914) – Swan Islands anole, Nelson's anole
Anolis nemonteae Ayala-Varela, Valverde, Poe, Narvaez, Yanez-Munoz, & Torres-Carvajal, 2021
Anolis nicefori (Dunn, 1944) – Niceforo's Andes anole
Anolis nietoi Köhler et al., 2014
Anolis nigrolineatus (Williams, 1965)
Anolis noblei (Barbour & Shreve, 1935) – Oriente giant anole, Holguin anole
Anolis notopholis (Boulenger, 1896) – scalyback anole
Anolis nubilis (Garman, 1888) – Redonda anole

O

Anolis occultus (Williams & Rivero, 1965) – Puerto Rican twig anole, limestone anole, dwarf anole
Anolis ocelloscapularis (Köhler, McCranie & Wilson, 2001)
Anolis oculatus (Cope, 1879) – Dominican anole, eyed anole
Anolis oligaspis Cope, 1894 – Bahama anole
Anolis olssoni (Schmidt, 1919) – desert grass anole, Monte Cristi anole, Olsson's anole
Anolis olssoni alienus Schwartz, 1981
Anolis olssoni dominigensis Schwartz, 1981
Anolis olssoni extentus Schwartz, 1981
Anolis olssoni ferrugicauda Schwartz, 1981
Anolis olssoni insulanus Schwartz, 1981
Anolis olssoni montivagus Schwartz, 1981
Anolis olssoni olssoni Schmidt, 1919
Anolis olssoni palloris Schwartz, 1981
Anolis omiltemanus (Davis, 1954) – Omilteme anole
Anolis onca (O'Shaughnessy, 1875) – bulky anole
Anolis opalinus (Gosse, 1850) – Jamaican opal-bellied anole, Bluefields anole
Anolis ophiolepis (Cope, 1862) – five-striped grass anole, snakescale anole
Anolis oporinus Garrido & Hedges, 2001 – Pimienta green anole
Anolis orcesi (Lazell, 1969) – Orces's Andes anole
Anolis ortonii (Cope, 1868) – bark anole, Orton's anole
Anolis osa (Köhler, Dehling, & Köhler, 2010)
Anolis otongae (Ayala-Varela & Velasco, 2010)
Anolis oxylophus (Cope, 1868) – stream anole

P

Anolis pachypus (Cope, 1876)
Anolis paravertebralis (Bernal-Carlo & Roze, 2005)
Anolis parilis (Williams, 1975) – Ecuador anole
Anolis parvauritus (Williams, 1966) – giant green anole, neotropical green anole
Anolis parvicirculatus (Álvarez del Toro & H.M. Smith, 1956) – Berriozabal anole
Anolis paternus Hardy, 1967 – ashy bush anole, Nueva Gerona anole
Anolis paternus paternus Hardy, 1967
Anolis paternus pinarensis Garrido, 1975
Anolis pecuarius  Schwartz, 1969 – Île-à-Vache green anole
Anolis pentaprion (Cope, 1863) – lichen anole
Anolis peraccae (Boulenger, 1898)
Anolis peruensis Poe, Latella, Ayala-Varela, Yañez-Miranda, & Torres-Carvajal, 2015
Anolis petersii (Bocourt, 1873) – Peters's anole
Anolis peucephilus Kohler, Trejo-Perez, Petersen, & Mendez De La Cruz, 2014
Anolis peynadoi Mertens, 1939 – western Hispaniola green anole, northern Hispaniolan green anole, Hispaniolan green anole
Anolis phyllorhinus (Myers & Carvalho, 1945) – leaf-nosed anole, bat anole
Anolis pigmaequestris (Garrido, 1975) – pygmy giant anole, Cayo Francés anole
Anolis pijolense (McCranie, Wilson, & Williams, 1993)
Anolis pinchoti Cochran, 1931 – Crab Cay anole
Anolis placidus Hedges & Thomas, 1989 – Neiba twig anole, placid anole
Anolis planiceps Troschel, 1848 – golden-scaled anole, orange-fanned leaf-litter anole, goldenscale anole
Anolis podocarpus (Ayala-Varela & Torres-Carvajal, 2010)
Anolis poecilopus (Cope, 1862) – dappled anole
Anolis poei Ayala-Varela, Troya-Rodríguez, Talero-Rodríguez, & Torres-Carvajal, 2014 – Telimbela anole
Anolis pogus (Lazell, 1972) – Anguilla Bank bush anole, Watts's anole
Anolis polylepis (Peters, 1874) – many-scaled anole, Golfo-Dulce anole
Anolis poncensis (Stejneger, 1904) – Ponce anole
Anolis porcatus |Gray, 1840 – Cuban green anole
Anolis porcatus aracelyae Perez-Beato, 1996
Anolis porcatus porcatus Gray, 1840
Anolis porcus (Cope, 1864) – Oriente bearded anole
Anolis prasinorius Kohler & Hedges, 2016 – Baoruco green twig anole
Anolis princeps (Boulenger, 1902) – first anole
Anolis proboscis (Peters & Orces, 1956) – horned anole, Pinocchio lizard
Anolis properus Schwartz, 1968 – Hispaniolan gracile anole, bark anole
Anolis propinquus (Williams, 1984)
Anolis pseudokemptoni (Köhler, Ponce, Sunyer, & Batista, 2007) 
Anolis pseudopachypus (Köhler, Ponce, Sunyer, & Batista, 2007)
Anolis pseudotigrinus (Amaral, 1933) – false tiger anole
Anolis pulchellus Duméril & Bibron, 1837 – Puerto Rican bush anole, Puerto Rican anole, snake anole
Anolis pumilus Garrido, 1988 – Cuban spiny-plant anole
Anolis punctatus (Daudin, 1802) – spotted anole, Amazon green anole
Anolis punctatus boulengeri O'Shaughnessy, 1881
Anolis punctatus punctatus Daudin, 1802
Anolis purpurescens (Cope, 1899) – purple anole
Anolis purpurgularis (McCranie, Cruz, & Holm, 1993)
Anolis purpuronectes Gray, Meza-Lazaro, Poe, & Nieto-Montes De Oca, 2016
Anolis pygmaeus (Álvarez del Toro & H.M Smith, 1956) – Chiapis pygmy anole

Q
Anolis quadriocellifer (Barbour & Ramsden, 1919) – Cuban eyespot anole, peninsula anole
Anolis quaggulus (Cope, 1885)
Anolis quercorum (Fitch, 1979) – Oaxacan oak anole, gray anole

R
Anolis ravifaux Schwartz & Henderson, 1982 - Saona stout anole 
Anolis ravitergum Schwartz, 1968 - Hispaniolan gracile anole, bark anole
Anolis reconditus (Underwood & Williams, 1959) – Blue Mountains anole
Anolis rejectus Garrido & Schwartz, 1972 – Santiago grass anole
Anolis richardii (Duméril & Bibron, 1837) – Grenada tree anole
Anolis ricordii (Duméril & Bibron, 1837) – Haitian giant anole, Haitian green anole
Anolis ricordi leberi Williams, 1965
Anolis ricordi ricordi Duméril & Bibron, 1837
Anolis ricordi subsolanus Schwartz, 1974
Anolis ricordi viculus Schwartz, 1974
Anolis rimarum (Thomas & Schwartz, 1967) – Artibonite bush anole, marmelade anole
Anolis rivalis (Williams, 1984) – neighbor anole
Anolis roatanensis (Köhler & McCranie, 2001) – Roatan anole
Anolis rodriguezii  – Middle American smooth anole, Rodriguez's anole
Anolis roosevelti Grant, 1931 – Virgin Islands giant anole, Culebra Island giant anole
Anolis roquet (Lacépède, 1788) – savannah anole, Martinique anole, Martinique's anole
Anolis roquet majolgris Lazell, 1972
Anolis roquet roquet (Lacépède, 1788)
Anolis roquet salinei Lazell, 1972
Anolis roquet summus Lazell, 1972
Anolis roquet zebrilus Lazell, 1972
Anolis rubiginosus Bocourt, 1873 – Sierra Juarez anole
Anolis rubribarbaris (Köhler, McCranie, & Wilson 1999)
Anolis rubribarbus (Barbour & Ramsden, 1919) – Sagua de Tánamo anole
Anolis ruibali Navarro & Garrido, 2004 – Cabo Cruz pallid anole
Anolis ruizi  (Rueda & Williams, 1986)
Anolis rupinae (Williams & Webster, 1974) – Haitian banded red-bellied anole, Castillon anole

S
Anolis sabanus Garman, 1887 – Saban anole
Anolis sacamecatensis G. Köhler et al., 2014

Anolis sagrei Duméril & Bibron, 1837 – Cuban brown anole, brown anole
Anolis sagrei mayensis H.M. Smith & Burger, 1949
Anolis sagrei sagrei Duméril & Bibron, 1837
Anolis salvini Boulenger, 1885 – Salvin's anole
Anolis santamartae E. Williams, 1982 – Santa Marta anole
Anolis savagei Poe & Ryan, 2017
Anolis saxatilis Mertens, 1938 – palid stout anole, Whiteman's anole
Anolis saxatilis lapidosus Schwartz, 1980
Anolis saxatilis saxatilis Williams, 1963
Anolis schiedei (Wiegmann, 1834) – Schiede's anole
Anolis schwartzi Lazell, 1972 – Saint Kitts Bank bush anole, Schwartz's anole, Statia Bank bush anole
Anolis scriptus Garman, 1887 – southern Bahamas anole, Silver Key anole
Anolis scriptus leucophaeus Garman, 1888
Anolis scriptus mariguanae Cochran, 1931
Anolis scriptus scriptus Garman, 1887
Anolis scriptus sularum Barbour & Shreve, 1935
Anolis scypheus Cope, 1864 – yellow-tongued anole 
Anolis semilineatus Cope, 1864 – Hispaniolan grass anole, Santo Domingo anole, half-lined Hispaniolan grass anole
Anolis sericeus Hallowell, 1856 – silky anole
Anolis serranoi (G. Köhler, 1999)
Anolis sheplani Schwartz, 1974 – Baoruco gray twig anole, Cabral anole
Anolis shrevei (Cochran, 1939) – Cordillera central stout anole, Shreve's anole
Anolis sierramaestrae Holáňová, Rehák & Frynta, 2012 – Sierra Maestrae bearded anole
Anolis singularis E. Williams, 1965 – Macaya green twig anole, porcupine anole
Anolis smallwoodi Schwartz, 1964 – green-blotched giant anole, Smallwood's anole
Anolis smallwoodi palardis Schwartz, 1964
Anolis smallwoodi saxuliceps Schwartz, 1964
Anolis smallwoodi smallwoodi' Schwartz, 1964Anolis smaragdinus Barbour & Shreve, 1935 – Bahamian green anoleAnolis smaragdinus lerneri Oliver, 1948Anolis smaragdinus smaragdinus Barbour & Shreve, 1935Anolis sminthus Dunn & Emlen, 1932 – mouse anoleAnolis soinii Poe & Yañez-Miranda, 2008Anolis solitarius Ruthven, 1916 – solitaire anoleAnolis spectrum Peters, 1863 – black-shouldered ground anole, Matanzas anole, ghost anoleAnolis spilorhipis (Alvarez Del Toro & Smith, 1956) Anolis squamulatus Peters, 1863 – small-scaled anoleAnolis stevepoei G. Köhler et al., 2014Anolis strahmi Schwartz, 1979 – Baoruco stout anole, Strahm's anoleAnolis strahmi abditus Schwartz, 1979Anolis strahmi strahmi Schwartz, 1979Anolis stratulus Cope 1861 – banded anole, spotted anole, or St. Thomas anoleAnolis subocularis Davis, 1954 Pacific anoleAnolis sulcifrons Cope, 1899 – grooved anole

TAnolis tandai Avila-Pires, 1995 – Tanda's anoleAnolis taylori (H.M. Smith & Spieler, 1945) – Taylor's anoleAnolis tenorioensis (G. Köhler, 2011)Anolis terraealtae (Barbour 1915) – Les Saines anole, Les Saintes anoleAnolis terueli Navarro, Fernandez & Garrido, 2001 – yellow-fanned pallid anoleAnolis tetarii (Barros, Williams, & Viloria, 1996)Anolis tigrinus (Peters, 1863) – tiger anoleAnolis toldo  Fong & Garrido, 2000 – gray-banded green anoleAnolis tolimensis (Werner, 1916)Anolis townsendi (Stejneger, 1900) – Townsend's anole, Cocos Island anoleAnolis trachyderma (Cope, 1876) – common forest anole, roughskin anoleAnolis transversalis (Duméril, 1851) – banded tree anole, transverse anoleAnolis trinitatis (Reinhardt & Lütken, 1862) – St. Vincent Bush anole, Saint Vincent's bush anole, Trinidad anoleAnolis triumphalis (Nicholson & Kohler, 2014)Anolis tropidogaster (Hallowell, 1856) – tropical anoleAnolis tropidolepis (Boulenger, 1885) – swift anoleAnolis tropidonotus (Peters, 1863) – greater scaly anole

UAnolis umbrivagus (Bernal-Carlo & Roze, 2005)Anolis uniformis (Cope, 1885) – lesser scaly anoleAnolis unilobatus (Köhler & Vesely, 2010) – blue-spotted fan anoleAnolis urraoi Grisales-Martínez et al. (2017) – Urrao anoleAnolis ustus Cope, 1864Anolis utilensis (Köhler, 1996) – Utila anole, mangrove anole

VAnolis valencienni (Duméril & Bibron, 1837) – Jamaican twig anole, short-tail anoleAnolis vanidicus Garrido & Schwartz, 1972 – Escambray grass anole, Vanidicus anoleAnolis vanzolinii (Williams, Orces, Matheus, & Bleiweiss, 1996)Anolis vaupesianus (Williams, 1982) – Williams's anoleAnolis ventrimaculatus (Boulenger, 1911) – speckled anoleAnolis vermiculatus Cocteau, 1837 –  Cuban stream anole, Vinales anoleAnolis vescus Garrido & Hedges – Sierra Del Purial bush anole, Purial bush anoleAnolis vicarius (Williams, 1986)Anolis villai (Fitch & Henderson, 1976) – Great Corn Island anole, country anoleAnolis vinosus Schwartz, 1968Anolis viridulus Díaz, Cádiz, Velazco, & Kawata, 2022Anolis viridius Kohler & Hedges, 2016 – Barahona green anoleAnolis vittigerus Cope, 1862 – garland anole

WAnolis wampuensis (McCranie & Köhler, 2001)Anolis wattsii (Boulenger, 1911) – Watts's anoleAnolis websteri (Arnold, 1980) – yellow-bellied desert anole , Webster's anoleAnolis wellbornae (Ahl, 1940)Anolis wermuthi (Köhler & Obermeier, 1998) – Wermuth's anoleAnolis williamsmittermeierorum Poe & Yañez-Miranda, 2007 – Williams-Mittermeier anoleAnolis wilsoni (Kohler, Townsend, & Petersen, 2016) Anolis woodi (Dunn, 1940) – Wood's anole

YAnolis yoroensis (McCranie, Nicholson, & Köhler, 2001)

ZAnolis zapotecorum Köhler et al., 2014Anolis zeus (Köhler & McCranie, 2001)

References

Further reading
Schwartz, Albert; Thomas, Richard (1975). A Check-list of West Indian Amphibians and Reptiles. Carnegie Museum of Natural History Special Publication No. 1. Pittsburgh, Pennsylvania: Carnegie Museum of Natural History. 216 pp. (Anolis'' species, pp. 64–107).

.
Anolis lizards
Articles containing video clips